Kamyshi is a rural locality (a selo) and the administrative center of Kamyshinsky Selsoviet of Nemetsky National District, Altai Krai, Russia. The population was 580 as of 2016. There are 3 streets.

Geography 
Kamyshi is located within the Kulunda Plain, 32 km northwest of Galbshtadt (the district's administrative centre) by road. Podsosnovo is the nearest rural locality.

Ethnicity 
The village is inhabited by Russians, Germans and others.

References 

Rural localities in Nemetsky National District